The Girl Habit is a 1931 American pre-Code comedy film directed by Edward F. Cline and written by Owen Davis, Clayton Hamilton, Gertrude Purcell and A.E. Thomas. The film stars Charlie Ruggles, Tamara Geva, Margaret Dumont, Allen Jenkins and Donald Meek. The film was released on June 27, 1931, by Paramount Pictures.

Cast 
Charlie Ruggles as Charlie Floyd
Tamara Geva as Sonja Maloney
Sue Conroy as Lucy Ledyard
Margaret Dumont as Blanche Ledyard
Allen Jenkins as Tony Maloney
Donald Meek as Jonesy
Douglas Gilmore as Huntley Palmer
Jerome Daley as Warden Henry
Betty Garde as Hattie Henry

Reception 
Motion Picture Herald found the film "refreshing" with a "constant flow of laughter," specifically citing Charlie Ruggles as the main reason the picture delighted audiences. Screenland, however, was not as enthusiastic, saying the scenes were overlong.

References

External links 
 

1931 films
American comedy films
1931 comedy films
Paramount Pictures films
Films directed by Edward F. Cline
American black-and-white films
1930s English-language films
1930s American films